The 2019 Bretagne Classic Ouest–France was a road cycling one-day race that took place on 1 September 2019 in France. It was the 83rd edition of Bretagne Classic Ouest–France and the 34th event of the 2019 UCI World Tour. It was won by Sep Vanmarcke.

Teams
Twenty-five teams, including all 18 UCI WorldTour teams and seven UCI Professional Continental teams, participated in the race. Of those riders, only 90 finished the race.

UCI WorldTeams

 
 
 
 
 
 
 
 
 
 
 
 
 
 
 
 
 
 

UCI Professional Continental teams

Results

References

Bretagne Classic Ouest–France
Bretagne Classic Ouest–France
Bretagne Classic Ouest–France
Bretagne Classic